The hoary-throated barwing (Actinodura nipalensis) is a species of bird in the family Leiothrichidae.

It is found in along the northern parts of the Indian subcontinent, primarily in the Eastern Himalayas, and ranges across  Bhutan, India, Tibet, and Nepal. Its natural habitats are temperate forest and subtropical or tropical moist montane forest.

References

Collar, N. J. & Robson C. 2007. Family Timaliidae (Babblers)  pp. 70 – 291 in; del Hoyo, J., Elliott, A. & Christie, D.A. eds. Handbook of the Birds of the World, Vol. 12. Picathartes to Tits and Chickadees. Lynx Edicions, Barcelona.

hoary-throated barwing
Birds of Nepal
Birds of Bhutan
hoary-throated barwing
Taxonomy articles created by Polbot
Taxobox binomials not recognized by IUCN